The 1986 Volvo International was a men's tennis tournament played on outdoor hard courts at the Stratton Mountain Resort in Stratton Mountain, Vermont, United States, and was part of the 1986 Nabisco Grand Prix. The tournament ran from August 4 through August 11, 1986. First-seeded Ivan Lendl won the singles title.

Finals

Singles

 Ivan Lendl defeated  Boris Becker 6–4, 7–6
 It was Lendl's 7th singles title of the year and the 60th of his career.

Doubles

 Peter Fleming /  John McEnroe defeated  Paul Annacone /  Christo van Rensburg 6–3, 3–6, 6–3
 It was Fleming's 2nd title of the year and the 59th of his career. It was McEnroe's 1st title of the year and the 125th of his career.

References

External links
 ITF tournament edition details

 
Volvo International
Volvo International
Volvo International
Volvo International